The north of the Moldavia region in Romania preserves numerous religious buildings as a testimony of the Moldavian architectural style developed in the Principality of Moldavia starting from the 14th century.

Of these, eight Romanian Orthodox Churches located in Suceava County and built from the late 15th century to the late 16th century are listed by UNESCO as a World Heritage Site, since 1993. Church of the Resurrection within the Sucevița Monastery was added to the site in 2010. The churches have their external walls covered in authentic and unique fresco paintings, representing complete cycles of religious themes.

World Heritage Site

Other churches

See also
 Byzantium after Byzantium
 Christianity in Romania
 Eastern Orthodox Church
 List of World Heritage Sites in Romania
 Moldavian vault
 Moldavian style
 Seven Wonders of Romania
 Romanian architecture
 Tourism in Romania

References 

Kocój E., Świątynie, postacie, ikony. Malowane cerkwie i monastyry Bukowiny Południowej w wyobrażeniach rumuńskich [Temples, persons, icons. Painted churches and monasteries of South Bucovina in Romanian imagology], Kraków 2006, Wydawnictwo Uniwersytetu Jagiellońskiego, ss. 444, 120 photos, https://www.academia.edu/24331662/%C5%9Awi%C4%85tynie_postacie_ikony._Malowane_cerkwie_i_monastyry_Bukowiny_Po%C5%82udniowej_w_wyobra%C5%BCeniach_rumu%C5%84skich_Temples_persons_icons._Painted_churches_and_monasteries_of_South_Bukovina_in_Romanian_imagology_Wydawnictwo_Uniwersytetu_Jagiello%C5%84skiego_Krak%C3%B3w_2006_s._440

External links

 UNESCO: Churches of Moldavia World Heritage Site
 Cultural Heritage and Religious Tourism in Bucovina and Moldavia
 The Painted Wonders of Bucovina
 Monasteries of Bucovina
 Ten Wonders of Bucovina- article with images.
 Painted Churches in Bukovina
 Bukovina's Painted Monasteries- article with images and location details.

 
History of Moldavia
Bukovina
Buildings and structures in Suceava County
Architecture in Romania
World Heritage Sites in Romania